The 1923 All-Pro Team consists of American football players chosen by various selectors as the best players at their positions for the All-Pro team of the National Football League (NFL) for the 1923 NFL season. Tackle Pete Henry of the Canton Bulldogs and quarterback Paddy Driscoll of the Chicago Cardinals were the only two players unanimously selected as first-team All-Pros by all known selectors.  Two African-American players won All-Pro honors: ends Inky Williams of the Hammond Pros and Duke Slater of the Rock Island Independents.

Selectors and key
For the 1923 season, there are four known selectors of All-Pro Teams.  They are:

GB = The Green Bay Press-Gazette compiled first, second, and third teams, based on polling of sports writers from the Green Bay Press-Gazette, Racine Times Call, Pittsburgh Post, Racine Journal News, Pittsburgh Gazette Times, Milwaukee Wisconsin News, Duluth News Tribune, Rock Island Argus, Akron Times, Cleveland News, Canton Repository, Ohio State Journal, Dayton Journal, Minnesota Daily Star, and St. Louis Times. The results of the above poll were simultaneously published in the Rock Island Argus, Ohio State Journal, and Canton Repository.

CE = Collyer's Eye was a Chicago sports journal.  Its All-Pro teams (a first and second team) were selected by E. G. Brands. 

VD = Vince Dolan, sports editor of the Canton Daily News picked first- and second-team All-Pro teams. Dolan's picks were published in the Canton Daily News on December 16, 1923. Dolan also gave "honorable mention" recognition to players below his first and second team. The 11 players named to Dolan's first team included seven members of the undefeated 1923 Canton Bulldogs team that won the 1923 NFL championship.

GC = Guy Chamberlin (GC), player and head coach of the Canton Bulldogs, selected a 32-player All-Pro team that was published on December 16, 1923, in the Canton Daily News. Chamberlin's selections did not divide players into first, second, and third teams. Out of the 32 players selected by Chamberlin, 11 were his teammates on the Canton Bulldogs. Chamberlin did not, however, select himself as an All-Pro.

Players who were selected as first-team All-Pros by two of the above selectors are displayed in bold typeface. Players who have been inducted into the Pro Football Hall of Fame are designated with a "†" next to their names.

Selections by position

Ends

Tackles

Guards

Centers

Quarterbacks

Halfbacks

Fullbacks

References

All-Pro Teams
1923 National Football League season